Sarab Gur-e Tuti (also Romanized as Sarāb Gūr-e Ţūţī; also known as Gūr Ţūţī and Kūr Ţūţī) is a village in Rudbar Rural District, Central District, Sirvan County, Ilam Province, Iran. At the 2006 census, its population was 137, in 24 families. The village is populated by Kurds.

References 

Populated places in Sirvan County
Kurdish settlements in Ilam Province